John L. Sampson (born June 17, 1965) is an American former politician and convicted felon. A Democrat, Sampson represented District 19 in the New York State Senate from 1997 to 2015. He is of Guyanese heritage. Sampson became Senate Democratic Leader in June 2009 and served as Senate Minority Leader from January 2011 to December 2012. Sampson forfeited his Senate seat when he was convicted of federal felony charges on July 24, 2015. On January 18, 2017, he was sentenced to five years in prison.

Education and early legal career
Sampson earned his B.A. in Political Science from Brooklyn College and a J.D. from Albany Law School (class of 1991). He was a member of the Board of Trustees of Albany Law School.

Sampson worked as law clerk with the Department of Environmental Conservation and as a Staff Attorney to the Legal Aid Society of New York.

Starting in 1994, he worked as an attorney for the law firm of Alter and Barbaro, Esqs.

Political career
Elected in 1996 to the New York State Senate, Sampson served in the Senate from 1997 to July 2015. He was the Chairman of the Senate Judiciary Committee and Deputy Majority Leader for State/Federal Relations. He was also the ranking minority member of the Senate Health Committee. Sampson represented Senate District 19 in Brooklyn.

Sampson had the distinction of being the first African-American to serve as the Chairman of the Senate Judiciary Committee. He also served as Chair of the Senate Ethics Committee and the Senate Administrative Regulations Review Commission.

In 2005, Sampson made an unsuccessful bid to become District Attorney of Kings County, New York, opposing the incumbent, Charles "Joe" Hynes.

On June 15, 2009, Sampson was elevated to the leadership of the Democratic Conference of the State Senate. As conference chairman, he was responsible for the day-to-day operations and the legislative agenda of the Democratic caucus. He served in leadership alongside former Majority Leader and Temporary Senate President Malcolm Smith. From January 2011 to December 2012, he served as Senate Minority Leader. On December 17, 2012, Sampson was ousted from his leadership post when Democrats elected Andrea Stewart-Cousins as Senate Democratic Leader.

On May 6, 2013, Sampson was indicted by a federal grand jury for embezzlement, obstruction of justice, and making false statements to the Federal Bureau of Investigation stemming from alleged theft of $400,000 from the sale of foreclosed homes, to which he pleaded not guilty. On the same day, Sampson was stripped of his committee assignments and ranking positions and removed from the Senate Democratic Conference. Despite the indictment, Sampson won re-election in 2014.

On July 24, 2015, Sampson was convicted of one count of obstruction of justice and two counts of making false statements to federal agents, which are felonies, and was automatically expelled from the Senate.

On March 10, 2016, the Appellate Division of the New York Supreme Court suspended Sampson from the practice of law. Because of an appeal based on the 2016 United States Supreme Court decision that overturned the conviction of former Virginia Governor Bob McDonnell, Sampson was sentenced on January 18, 2017 to five years in prison. He was released on parole in August 2021.

See also
Paterson, David "Black, Blind, & In Charge: A Story of Visionary Leadership and Overcoming Adversity."Skyhorse Publishing. New York, New York, 2020

References

Democratic Party New York (state) state senators
Albany Law School alumni
1965 births
Living people
New York (state) politicians convicted of crimes
African-American state legislators in New York (state)
21st-century American politicians
21st-century African-American politicians
20th-century African-American people